Danielle Hacquard (born 1961) is a French ski mountaineer who competed successfully in the three best known races of the Alps, the Pierra Menta, the Patrouille des Glaciers and the Trofeo Mezzalama. She is member of the SC Val d'Isère.

Results 
 1992: 6th, Pierra Menta, together with Pierre Buttin
 1994: 2nd, Pierra Menta, together with Isabel Rogé Tartarini
 1995: 3rd, Pierra Menta, together with Isabel Rogé Tartarini
 1996: 2nd, Pierra Menta, together with Isabel Rogé Tartarini
 1997: 2nd, Pierra Menta, together with Véronique Lathuraz
 1998:
 2nd, Pierra Menta, together with Véronique Lathuraz
 3rd, Patrouille des Glaciers, together with Corinne Favre and Véronique Lathuraz
 1999:
 1st, Pierra Menta, together with Claudine Trécourt
 1st, Trofeo Mezzalama, together with Gloriana Pellissier and Véronique Lathuraz

References 

1961 births
Living people
French female ski mountaineers
20th-century French women